Tazobactam is a pharmaceutical drug that inhibits the action of bacterial β-lactamases, especially those belonging to the SHV-1 and TEM groups. It is commonly used as its sodium salt, tazobactam sodium. In simple terms, it is an ingredient that can be added to certain antibiotics to make them less vulnerable to bacteria's antimicrobial resistance.

Tazobactam is combined with the extended spectrum β-lactam antibiotic piperacillin in the drug piperacillin/tazobactam, used in infections due to Pseudomonas aeruginosa. Tazobactam broadens the spectrum of piperacillin by making it effective against organisms that express β-lactamase and would normally degrade piperacillin.

Tazobactam is a heavily modified penicillin and a sulfone.

Tazobactam was patented in 1982 and came into medical use in 1992.

See also
 Ceftolozane
 Sulbactam
 Clavulanate

References

Antibiotics
Beta-lactam antibiotics
Beta-lactamase inhibitors
Sulfones
Triazoles